The 1901–02 World Championship was an exhibition football match that took place at High Road Ground (the erstwhile name of White Hart Lane) on 2 September 1901 and Tynecastle Park on 2 January 1902 between the winners of the English Football Association Challenge Cup, Tottenham Hotspur, and the Scottish Cup, Heart of Midlothian.

The game was not the first "World Championship" game between English and Scottish sides; indeed, it was the second time Hearts had played this game. 

The contest was won by Heart of Midlothian, 3–1 on aggregate.

The fact that the first leg was played by all 11 of Tottenham's cup-winning team, and nine of Hearts', indicates that it was taken seriously by both clubs.

Participant teams

Match details

First leg

Second leg

References 

1901–02 in Scottish football
1901–02 in English football
World Championship 1901-02
World Championship 1901-02
September 1901 sports events
January 1902 sports events
1901 sports events in London
International association football competitions hosted by England
International association football competitions hosted by Scotland